The 2018 North Carolina Tar Heels baseball team are representing the University of North Carolina at Chapel Hill in the 2018 NCAA Division I baseball season. Head Coach Mike Fox is in his 20th year coaching the Tar Heels. They play their home games at Bryson Field at Boshamer Stadium and are members of the Atlantic Coast Conference.

The Tar Heels won the ACC Coastal Division, and matched Clemson for the best record in the conference.  They reached the 2018 College World Series, their eleventh time advancing to Omaha and first since 2013.

Roster

Schedule

Ranking movements

References 

North Carolina Tar Heels
North Carolina Tar Heels baseball seasons
Atlantic Coast Conference baseball champion seasons
College World Series seasons
2018 NCAA Division I baseball tournament participants
North